Agrostis subulata is a grass (i.e., a member of the Poaceae family), which grows only on Campbell Island and on Antipodes Island in New Zealand.

Description 
Agrostis subulata is a perennial, densely tufted, clumping grass, with erect dull blue-green leaves which are taller than the spiked inflorescences.

Habitat 
It is found in herbfields, in  Chionochloa antarctica grasslands and on peat covered rock ledges.

Taxonomy
Agrostis subulata was first described in 1845 by Joseph Hooker in his Flora Antarctica.

Conservation status
In both 2009 and 2012 it was deemed to be "At Risk - Naturally Uncommon" under the New Zealand Threat Classification System, and this New Zealand classification was reaffirmed in 2018 (due to its restricted range).

References

External links
Agrostis subulata images and occurrence data from GBIF

subulata
Plants described in 1845
Flora of New Zealand
Taxa named by Joseph Dalton Hooker